Kholodnaya Rechka is a village in the Gagra District of Abkhazia, Georgia.

See also
 Gagra District

Notes

References
 Georgian Soviet Encyclopedia, V. 11, p. 495, Tb., 1987 year.

Gagra District Administration

Other

Populated places in Gagra District